Retinoblastoma-like protein 2 is a protein that in humans is encoded by the RBL2 gene.

Interactions 

Retinoblastoma-like protein 2 has been shown to interact with:

 BRCA1,
  BRF1 
 C-Raf, 
 Cyclin E1, 
 Cyclin-dependent kinase 2, 
 HDAC1, 
 Prohibitin,  and
 RBBP8.

See also 
 Pocket protein family

References

Further reading

External links 
 

Transcription factors